Dana A. Williams is a scholar of African American literature and university administrator. She is professor and chair of the English department at Howard University. In 2021, she became Dean of Graduate Studies at Howard. She is the former president of the College Language Association and of the Association of Departments of English.

Education 
Williams has a B.A. in English from Grambling State University (Louisiana), received in 1993, an M.A. (1995) from Howard University, and Ph.D. in African American literature from Howard (1998).

Career 
While a graduate student, Williams published Contemporary African American Female Playwrights: An Annotated Bibliography in 1999,, reviewed in Feminist Collections as "a service to theatrical producers and play enthusiasts alike" by locating more than sixty African American female writers with works published between 1959 and 1997—a group given minimal space in anthologies and other compilations. In Modern Drama, Kathy A. Perkins noted that the work's focus on African American women playwrights was the first contribution of its kind and said, "Not since the publication of Bernard Peterson's Contemporary Black American Playwrights and Their Plays (1988) has there been such a valuable resource in this field."

After completing her PhD, Williams was a Ford Foundation postdoctoral fellowship at Northwestern University in 1999. She taught at Louisiana State University for four years, then returned to teach at Howard in 2003. In 2005, she published  In the Light of Likeness—Transformed: The Literary Art of Leon Forrest, a study of African American fiction writer Leon Forrest, focusing on his use of black cultural traditions as well as his place in the Afro-modernist literary school. In 2008, she had a faculty fellowship at the John Hope Franklin Humanities Institute at Duke University. Williams went on to become professor and chair of the English department at Howard University.

Williams has been president of the College Language Association (the oldest and largest organization of professors of color who teach English and world languages) and of the Association of Departments of English, representing English, humanities and writing programs at colleges and universities in the US and Canada. She has also served on the National Council on the Humanities, nominated by President Barack Obama in 2016. She is on the advisory board of the Hurston-Wright Foundation, the Center for Black Literature, and the American Council of Learned Societies, and is president of the Toni Morrison Society.

In 2019, she was named interim dean of the graduate school at Howard. The position was made permanent in 2021.

Books 

 Contemporary African American Female Playwrights: An Annotated Bibliography (Greenwood 1999)
 co-ed. with Sandra G. Shannon, August Wilson and Black Aesthetics (Palgrave-MacMillan, 2004)
 In the Light of Likeness—Transformed: The Literary Art of Leon Forrest (Ohio State University Press, 2005)
 ed. African American Humor, Irony, and Satire: Ishmael Reed, Satirically Speaking (Cambridge Scholars, 2007)
 ed. Conversations with Leon Forrest (University Press of Mississippi, 2007)
 ed. Contemporary African American Fiction: New Critical Essays (Ohio State University Press, 2009)

References 

Howard University faculty
Howard University alumni
Grambling State University alumni
African-American women academic administrators
Literary scholars
African-American academic administrators
Year of birth missing (living people)
Living people